The Rugby Canada National Development Academy or Pacific Pride is a Canadian rugby union team that is based in Langford, British Columbia. The team acts as the high-performance development academy for Rugby Canada.

History

Originally active between 1996 and 2005, the Pacific Pride program was developed as a U-23 academy to support the development of young players in Canada. David Clark was the inaugural head coach of the program. The original incarnation of the Pacific Pride program was run by Rugby Canada and the Commonwealth Centre for Sport Development.

The Pride was resurrected in 2019 as a high-performance development academy intended for players between the ages of 18 and 24.

Personnel

Current squad

The 2021-22 Canadian Development Academy squad.

Coaching Staff

Head Coach: Phil Mack

Former head coaches
  Jamie Cudmore (2019-2021)

References

External links
 Rugby Canada's Home Page

Rugby union in Canada